Alejo Durán (born 20 May 1991) is a Uruguayan rugby union player. He was named in Uruguay's squad for the 2015 Rugby World Cup.

References

1991 births
Living people
Uruguayan rugby union players
Uruguay international rugby union players
Place of birth missing (living people)
Rugby union scrum-halves